Drug addiction is defined as out of control use of drugs despite their negative effects. In recent years Jammu and Kashmir has seen an exponential increase in the drug use. According to the United Nations Drug Control Program around 70000 people are addicted to drugs of which 4000 are females.

Extent of problem 
According to the United Nations Office on Drugs and Crime, Jammu and Kashmir has 60000 drug addicts. In last three years there has been an increase of 1500% in the use of drugs.

Treatment 
According to the survey report, treatment and specialist interventions were in short supply. The Drug de-addiction centres have been flooded in recent years. Most of the patients that are admitted in these centres are Heroin addicts.

References 

Illegal drug trade in Asia
Kashmir
Drugs in India